KMCF may refer to:

 KMCF-LD, a television station (channel 6, virtual 35) licensed to Visalia, California, United States
 the ICAO code for MacDill Air Force Base, in Tampa, Florida, United States